The 1992 World Polo Championship was played in Santiago Chile during April 1992 and was won by Argentina. This event brought together six teams from around the world in the Club de Polo y Equitación San Cristóbal.

Final Match

Final rankings

External links
1992 FIP World Championship III

1992
Polo competitions in Chile
Sport in Santiago
P
World Championship
World Polo Championship